Common Computing Security Standards Forum (CCSS Forum) is a voluntary organization of vendors and providers of security software, operating systems, and Internet browsers.

Goals
The CCSS Forum was formed to with the following goals:
 Mitigating the risk of malicious intent and software,
 Creating standards for the industry, and
 Including all security providers in order to maximize the benefit and protection of the end users.

History
In 2009, Melih Abdulhayoğlu organized the Common Computing Security Standards Forum initially for the purpose of maintaining a list of legitimate antivirus engines.

This was in response to "scareware" products that present themselves as antivirus software but are either adware or malware.
According to the FBI, they are aware of an estimated loss to victims from rogue antivirus software of as much as $150 million.

Whitelist
The CCSS maintains a so-called "whitelist" of legitimate organizations that provide antivirus systems. The "Trusted Vendors" list can be viewed on the organization's web site, http://www.ccssforum.org

References

Professional associations based in the United States
Organizations based in New Jersey
Organizations established in 2009
Computer security organizations
Antivirus software